Lafayette County  is a county located in the U.S. state of Arkansas. As of the 2020 census, the population was 6,308, making it the third-least populous county in Arkansas. The county seat is Lewisville. Lafayette County was formed on October 15, 1827, and named in honor of the Marquis de Lafayette, a French military hero of the American Revolutionary War. It is a dry county; therefore, the sale of alcohol is prohibited.

Geography
It is the smallest county in Arkansas by area.

Major highways
 U.S. Highway 82
 Highway 29
 Highway 53
 Highway 160

Adjacent counties
Hempstead County (north)
Nevada County (northeast)
Columbia County (east)
Webster Parish, Louisiana (southeast)
Bossier Parish, Louisiana (south)
Caddo Parish, Louisiana (southwest)
Miller County (west)

Demographics

2020 census

As of the 2020 United States census, there were 6,308 people, 2,784 households, and 1,801 families residing in the county.

2000 census
As of the 2000 United States Census, there were 8,559 people, 3,434 households, and 2,376 families residing in the county. The racial makeup of the county was 62.08% White, 36.49% Black or African American, 0.37% Native American, 0.22% Asian, 0.01% Pacific Islander, 0.20% from other races, and 0.63% from two or more races. 1.03% of the population were Hispanic or Latino of any race.

There were 3,434 households, out of which 27.90% had children under the age of 18 living with them, 50.60% were married couples living together, 14.40% had a female householder with no husband present, and 30.80% were non-families. 28.40% of all households were made up of individuals, and 14.60% had someone living alone who was 65 years of age or older. The average household size was 2.46 and the average family size was 3.00.

In the county, the population was spread out, with 25.40% under the age of 18, 8.10% from 18 to 24, 24.40% from 25 to 44, 24.40% from 45 to 64, and 17.70% who were 65 years of age or older. The median age was 39 years. For every 100 females, there were 93.60 males. For every 100 females age 18 and over, there were 87.80 males.

The median income for a household in the county was $24,831, and the median income for a family was $30,720. Males had a median income of $26,492 versus $17,000 for females. The per capita income for the county was $14,128. About 18.70% of families and 23.20% of the population were below the poverty line, including 31.50% of those under age 18 and 19.30% of those age 65 or over.

Government
Prior to 2000, Lafayette County was considered an "ancestral" Democratic county among white conservatives. Exceptions were the 1972 and 1984 landslides of Republicans Richard Nixon and Ronald Reagan, respectively.

Former Governor Bill Clinton of Arkansas, considered a son of the South, won this county twice in his presidential runs: 1992 and 1996. Clinton's vice president, Al Gore of Tennessee, another son of the South, won the county in 2000, the most recent Democrat to do so. Most of the minority of African-American voters have been affiliated since the 1960s with the national Democratic Party, even as conservative whites here shifted to the Republican Party.

Communities

Towns
 Bradley
 Buckner
 Lewisville (county seat)
 Stamps

Townships

 Baker (most of Stamps)
 French
 Hadley (Buckner, small part of Stamps)
 La Grange (small part of Lewisville)
 Mars Hill
 Roane (Bradley)
 Russell
 Steel (most of Lewisville)
 Walker Creek

Source:

Education
There are two school districts in the county: Lafayette County School District and the Emerson-Taylor-Bradley School District. Previously the Bradley School District was the second district; it merged into Emerson-Taylor-Bradley in 2013.

See also

 Honors and memorials to the Marquis de Lafayette
 List of counties in Arkansas
 List of lakes in Lafayette County, Arkansas
 National Register of Historic Places listings in Lafayette County, Arkansas

References

External links

 
1827 establishments in Arkansas Territory
Gilbert du Motier, Marquis de Lafayette
Populated places established in 1827